Gorgonolaureus is a monotypic genus of crustacean with only one species, Gorgonolaureus muzikae.

References 

Synagogidae
Maxillopoda genera
Monotypic crustacean genera